The third season of Rising Star Indonesia aired on RCTI starting 17 December 2018. Judika, Ariel "Noah", and Rossa returned as experts from the previous season, while Indonesian composer Yovie Widianto replaced Anang Hermansyah. Audition was held in four major cities in Indonesia: Bandung, Surabaya, Medan, and Jakarta.

Regional Auditions

On 11 September 2018, it was announced that Rising Star Indonesia 2018 would begin the auditions in four big cities in Indonesia: Bandung, Medan, Surabaya, and Jakarta. Four cities also added as a special hunt auditions, those cities are Yogyakarta, Kupang, Makassar, and Ambon. Those who passed their first audition would go in front of the experts in Room Auditions.

The open call auditions were held in the following locations:

Room Auditions
The room auditions aired over five episodes from 17 December 2018 until 24 January 2019. The contestants who passed the first auditions then asked to sing their chosen song, and then at the end the experts would comment and also decided whether the contestant could go to the next round with a yes or a no. The contestant that received at least three yeses advanced to the Live Auditions. 70 soloist, duos, and group bands later selected to go through to the Live Auditions.

Live Auditions
Each performance begins with the contestant singing behind a screen ("The Wall"). Once the contestant reaches 70% of "Yes" votes, the wall was raised and the contestant goes to the next round of the competition. Alongside the viewers' vote, four of the experts have 5% of the vote each, which will be added should they vote "Yes". New twist was added this season, each experts had a golden arrow vote to immediately save a contestant who failed to reach the minimum bar to open the wall.

Color key

Live Auditions 1 (Jan. 7)

Live Auditions 2 (Jan. 8)

Live Auditions 3 (Jan. 14)

Live Auditions 4 (Jan. 15)

Live Auditions 5 (Jan. 21)

Live Auditions 6 (Jan. 22)

Live Duels
Contestants who make it through the auditions are paired by the judges to face off in a duel. The first contestant to sing, chosen by a coin toss before the show, sings with the wall up and sets the benchmark for the second contestant. The second contestant sings with the wall down. If the second contestant betters the first contestant's vote total, the wall rises and the second contestant was through to the next round while the first contestant is eliminated; if the second contestant fails to raise the wall, the second contestant is eliminated and the first contestant was through. A new twist also introduced this season, each experts could pick two contestants who lost their duels, so there will be 8 wild card contestants who could participate in the next round, The Final Duels.

Color key

Live Duels 1 (Jan. 28)

Live Duels 2 (Jan. 29)

Live Duels 3 (Feb. 3)

Live Duels 4 (Feb. 4)

Wild Card Round (Feb. 11)

Final Duels
Similar as The Live Duels in previous round which the first contestant sings with the wall up and sets the benchmark for the second contestant, and the second contestant sings with the wall down. If the second contestant betters the first contestant's vote total, the wall rises and the second contestant was through to the next round while the first contestant is eliminated, and applies to the opposite. The winner of this round will advanced to the next round, The Playoffs. And from this round on, the show only aired once a week.

Color key

Final Duels 1 (Feb. 18)
Nazril Irham couldn't attend the live show and replaced by Maia Estianty

Final Duels 2 (Feb. 25)

Live Playoffs
After the final duel rounds end, 13 of the contestants that survived perform. The first 2 contestants performed with the wall up, after which the contestant with the lowest vote total was placed in the hot seat. The subsequent contestants performed with the wall down, and they had to beat the vote total of the contestant in the hot seat to raise the wall. If they succeeded in doing so, the contestant in the hot seat was eliminated, the contestant with the next lowest vote total was placed in the hot seat, and the performing contestant was provisionally qualified; otherwise, the performing contestant was eliminated if they failed to raise the wall. This continues until the two contestants with the lowest number of votes were eliminated. In this stage, each expert's vote added 5% to the total.

Super 13 (Mar. 4)

Super 11 (Mar. 11)
Rossa couldn't attend the live show and was replaced by Maia Estianty. For some reasons all finalists performed with the wall up.

Super 9 (Mar. 18)

Super 7 (Mar. 25)

Semi-final

Super 5 (Apr. 1)

Elimination chart

References

2018 Indonesian television seasons
2019 Indonesian television seasons